Jia Lal (born 08 November 1964) is an Indian politician, who currently serves as Member of Legislative Assembly from Bharmour Assembly constituency. Jia Lal won from Bharmour constituency in 2017 state assembly elections.

Early life and education
Lal was born on 08 November 1964 in Bharmour, Chamba, Himachal Pradesh to Laxman Das and Laxmi Devi.
He did his school education up to Matriculation.

Politics
Lal's active state politics started from 1993 as he was the president of Bharatiya Janata Party Yuva Morcha, Bharmour Mandal from 1993-96. He was president of BJP for district Chamba from 2010-13.
Then in 2017, he was elected to the thirteenth Himachal Pradesh Legislative Assembly in December, 2017.

References
 

Bharatiya Janata Party politicians from Himachal Pradesh
1964 births
Living people
Himachal Pradesh MLAs 2017–2022